Events from the year 1783 in Ireland.

Incumbent
Monarch: George III

Events
 5 March – the Count de Belgioioso, bound from Liverpool to China, founders on the Kish Bank in Dublin Bay in a storm. On 2 June, Scottish diver Charles Spalding and his nephew Ebenezer Watson die in attempting to salvage the £150,000-worth of cargo from the ship using a diving bell of Spalding's design.
 17 March – Installation dinner for the founding of the Most Illustrious Order of St. Patrick by King George III of the United Kingdom takes place in Dublin Castle.
 17 April – the Renunciation Act, is passed by Westminster. It acknowledges the exclusive right of the Parliament of Ireland to legislate for Ireland.
 25 June – the Bank of Ireland opens for business in a former private residence at Mary's Abbey off Capel Street in Dublin and begins to issue notes.
 The first balloon ascent takes place on Leinster House grounds in Dublin
 3 October – first Waterford Crystal glassmaking business begins production in Waterford.

Births
26 April – Peter Boyle de Blaquière, politician in Canada and first chancellor of the University of Toronto (died 1860).
28 April – Sir Eyre Coote, KB, soldier (born 1726).
24 July – William Vesey-FitzGerald, 2nd Baron FitzGerald and Vesey, politician and statesman (died 1843).

Deaths
2 October – Joseph Leeson, 1st Earl of Milltown (born 1701).
10 October – Henry Brooke, writer (born 1703).
2 December – Thomas Burke, physician, lawyer and Governor of North Carolina (b. c1747).
Full date unknown
James Adair, trader with Native Americans and historian (b. c1709).
Robert Barber, quartermaster on HMS Adventure during Captain Cook's Second Voyage (born 1749).

References

 
Years of the 18th century in Ireland
Ireland
1780s in Ireland